Edmonton is a constituency in Greater London, created in 1918 and represented in the House of Commons of the UK Parliament since 2015 by Kate Osamor of the Labour Co-operative party. Edmonton is a North London constituency based around district of Edmonton in the London Borough of Enfield.

History

The seat dates back to 1918 at which time it was at an extremity of the largely urbanised London postal district outside of the County of London (1889–1965). It was a railway commuter town core outweighed by businesses beside the River Lea engaged in manufacturing, storage, distribution, and construction industries, among others. Population and housing were significantly less before the middle of the 19th century.

The seat was won by successive Labour party candidates since 1935 until narrowly gained by a Conservative at the 1983 United Kingdom general election.  The latter's majority increased in 1987 then reduced to a marginal majority in 1992.  After 1997 a trend of increased Labour majorities developed. Osamor's majority of 2015, 37.3%, made it the 43rd-safest Labour seat in ranking in 2015.  Likewise, save for a Conservative-leaning ward, Bush Hill Park, Edmonton's other wards usually elect Labour Party councillors since 1997.

Boundaries 

1918–1950: The Urban District of Edmonton.

1950–1974: The Municipal Borough of Edmonton.

1974–1983: The London Borough of Enfield wards of Angel Road, Bush Hill South, Church Street, Craig Park, Jubilee, New Park, Pymmes, St Alphege, St Peter's, and Silver Street.

1983–2010: The London Borough of Enfield wards of Angel Road, Craig Park, Huxley, Jubilee, Latymer, Raglan, St Alphege, St Mark's, St Peter's, Village, and Weir Hall.

2010–present: The London Borough of Enfield wards of Bush Hill Park, Edmonton Green, Haselbury, Jubilee, Lower Edmonton, Ponders End, and Upper Edmonton.

Boundary review
Following its review of parliamentary representation in North London, the Boundary Commission for England made some changes to Edmonton. Ponders End ward was transferred from the constituency of Enfield North to Edmonton. Part of Southbury ward was transferred to Enfield North. Parts of Grange ward, Palmers Green ward, and Bowes ward were transferred from Edmonton to Enfield, Southgate. Part of Bush Hill Park ward and a tiny part of Upper Edmonton ward were transferred from Enfield, Southgate to Edmonton.

Members of Parliament

Election results

Elections in the 2010s

Elections in the 2000s

Elections in the 1990s

Elections in the 1980s

Elections in the 1970s

Elections in the 1960s

Elections in the 1950s

Elections in the 1940s

Elections in the 1930s

Elections in the 1920s

Elections in the 1910s

See also 
 List of parliamentary constituencies in London

Notes

References

External links 

Politics Resources (Election results from 1922 onwards)
Electoral Calculus (Election results from 1955 onwards)

Parliamentary constituencies in London
Politics of the London Borough of Enfield
Constituencies of the Parliament of the United Kingdom established in 1918
Edmonton, London